In statistics, a univariate distribution is a probability distribution of only one random variable. This is in contrast to a multivariate distribution, the probability distribution of a random vector (consisting of multiple random variables).

Examples

One of the simplest examples of a discrete univariate distribution is the discrete uniform distribution, where all elements of a finite set are equally likely. It is the probability model for the outcomes of tossing a fair coin, rolling a fair die, etc.  The univariate continuous uniform distribution on an interval [a, b] has the property that all sub-intervals of the same length are equally likely.

Other examples of discrete univariate distributions include the binomial, geometric, negative binomial, and Poisson distributions. At least 750 univariate discrete distributions have been reported in the literature.

Examples of commonly applied continuous univariate distributions include the normal distribution, Student's t distribution, chisquare distribution, F distribution, exponential and gamma distributions.

See also
Univariate
Bivariate distribution
List of probability distributions

References

Further reading

Types of probability distributions